Sale is a comune (municipality) in the Province of Alessandria in the Italian region Piedmont, located about  east of Turin and about  northeast of Alessandria.

Sale borders the following municipalities: Alessandria, Alluvioni Piovera, Castelnuovo Scrivia, Guazzora, Isola Sant'Antonio, Tortona.

References

Cities and towns in Piedmont